Scouts Canada is a Canadian Scouting association providing programs for young people, between the ages of 5 to 26, with the stated aim "to help develop well rounded youth, better prepared for success in the world". Scouts Canada, in affiliation with the French-language Association des Scouts du Canada, is a member of the World Organization of the Scout Movement (WOSM). In 2019-20 youth membership stood at 53,259, an 18% decline from 64,693 in 2014-15. Over the same period, volunteer numbers also declined 18%, from 20,717 in 2015 to 16,885 in 2020. Scouts Canada has declined significantly in size since its peak: youth membership is down 82% from 288,084 in 1965 and volunteer numbers are down 50% from 33,524 in 1965.

Values

Scouts Canada states a commitment to the Scouting Method approach, which emphasizes the following elements:

 Scout Law and Promise
 Learning by Doing
 The Team System
 A Symbolic Framework
 Nature
 Personal Progression
 Adult Support
 Community Involvement

As part of its greater Canadian Path program, Scouts Canada has a "Religion in Life" emblem, that is awarded upon completion of a particular denomination's program by a Scout.  In 2009, a "Spirituality Award" for Scouts and Guides who did not belong to any denomination was also established. In the Summer of 2020, alternative promises for Beaver Scouts, Cub Scouts, and higher levels were offered for individuals, to allow them to commit to their country or personal affirmation, rather than to God or the King specifically, if they so choose.

History

Scouts Canada states "There is evidence that a few Scouting groups started up in Canada in 1907".

In his 1981 book, 75 Years of Scouting in Canada Robert Milks, the late Scouts Canada archivist, indicated that the first Scout groups in Canada were founded in 1908. St. Catharines and Merrickville are mentioned as among the locations of the first troops. Boy Scouts and the Scout Movement were well established in Canada, before Scouts Canada or its parent organization, The Boy Scouts Association of the United Kingdom were formed.

The Boy Scouts Association was formed in the United Kingdom in 1910 and incorporated in 1912. It has been claimed that its founder, Baden-Powell, wrote to Earl Grey, the Governor General of Canada in 1910 and asked him to organize Scouting in Canada. A branch of The Boy Scouts Association was established in Canada under The Boy Scouts Association's Overseas Department. The Canadian General Council of The Boy Scouts Association was incorporated by an Act of the Canadian Parliament on 12 June 1914. The Canadian General Council continued to be represented internationally by The Boy Scouts Association of the United Kingdom until 30 October 1946, when the Canadian General Council became a direct member of the Boy Scout World Conference, now the World Organization of the Scout Movement. The Canadian General Council of The Boy Scouts Association later changed its name to Boy Scouts of Canada by an amendment to its incorporating Act of Parliament. In 1976 the Scouts Canada logo was introduced and the organization, by its By-laws, adopted the name Scouts Canada. In 2007, the organization's name was amended to Scouts Canada in the establishing legislation.

In 1972, Scouts Canada began accepting female participants as part of its Rover Section. This was expanded in the late 1970s (but some sources cite 1984), to include the Venturer Section. In 1992, co-ed Scouting was an option for all program sections and became policy for all sections in 1998. The year following, the organization introduced its first gay Rover Crew in Toronto, Ontario.

In 1990, Jim Blain, the Chief Executive of Scouts Canada, was awarded the 202nd Bronze Wolf, the only distinction of the World Organization of the Scout Movement, awarded by the World Scout Committee for exceptional services to world Scouting. He was also a recipient of the Silver World Award.

In 2001 members saw a significant reorganization country wide. Regions and Districts were reorganized into Council and Areas. Many Districts employed their own staff, had their own youth assistance funds and separate Jamboree funds. All of this was under control and supervision of a local Board of Directors. This was made up of past commissioners and community business leaders, most of whom had a Scouting background in their youth. This was the group that handled staffing, helped identify future Trainers, Commissioners, and senior Service Scouters and supervised budgets for employees and camps and raised funds from the Community. There were other Districts, mainly rural and those in isolated communities who were not what were called 'employing councils' and the change was made to attempt to change these differences. Likewise, at this time Provincial Councils such as the Provincial Council for Ontario were disbanded.

In March 2011 Scouts Canada introduced a significant re-design of the organization's uniform that had been designed by Joe Fresh Style. Beavers uniforms changed only in colour and fabric. While the major changes in the uniform design are seen in the changes to the style of the button-up shirt and its colour from khaki to grey, green, blue, or red, for Cubs, Scouts, Venturers, Rovers/Leaders respectively. As part of the re-design the sash was eliminated as a uniform component, which has resulted in smaller proficiency badges being made for Cub Scouts and Scouts to sew directly onto their uniforms. The new design received high marks from Fashion magazine Flare stating that the new uniforms are both stylish and comfortable. The material for the red uniform shirt (not the activity golf shirt) changed in mid-2016 because of performance issues.

From 2012 through to 2017 Scouts Canada's National Youth Network organized an initiative to promote the principles of Scouting to both members of the organization and the general public. The campaign was designed to encourage Canadians to do 'good turns' for each other. For a number of years, silicon bracelets were distributed across Canada with the message "Good Turn Week." In addition to the original initiative, a fund was established to sponsor selected community service projects.

The Church of Jesus Christ of Latter-day Saints discontinued its long association with Scouts Canada at the end of 2019, which reduced nationwide youth membership by over 5%.

In 2021, Scouts Canada announced a mandatory COVID-19 vaccination requirement for all in-person meetings, effective from 1 November. The vaccine requirement was removed by Scouts Canada effective September 1, 2022.

Organizational structure

Scouts Canada is governed by a Board of Governors. Administration of the organization is divided into twenty Councils, each administering a whole province or large part thereof. The national body, Councils, and their respective Areas are organized around a key-three which include a Scouter, Youth, and Staff member. The national body is made up of a National Commissioner appointed by the Voting Members, a National Youth Commissioner appointed by the Voting Members, and an Executive Commissioner appointed the Board of Governors.

The Council key-three is made up of a Council Commissioner appointed by the National Commissioner, a Council Youth Commissioner appointed by the National Youth Commissioner, and a Council Executive Director appointed by the Executive Commissioner. Council Commissioners in consultation with their respective key-three furthermore appoint their management teams to manage the interests of the council.  All positions are advertised publicly and a selection committee interviews members based on skill set. The Area key-three is made up of an Area Commissioner appointed by the Council Commissioner, an Area Youth Commissioner appointed by the Council Youth Commissioner, and an Area Support Manager appointed by the Council Executive Director.

Scouts Canada is affiliated with Association des Scouts du Canada.

Under the World Organization of the Scout Movement's constitution, only one organization is recognized in each country. Canada is the only country in which this recognition is held jointly. Many other countries also have more than one Scouting organization and some of these have formed national federations which are the WOSM members. Scouts Canada and L'Association des Scouts du Canada send a joint delegation to meetings of the World Organization of the Scout Movement; this is coordinated through the Committee on Cooperation.

The Patron Scout of Canada is the current Governor General of Canada. From 1910 to 1946, the position of Chief Scout for Canada and, from 1946 to 2013, the position of Chief Scout of Canada were held by successive Governors General of Canada. On 19 April 2013, the Scouts Canada Board of Governors appointed Terry Grant as Chief Scout of Canada and the honorary title held by the governor general was renamed to Patron Scout.

Sections

Full-time sections

The full-time sections of Scouts Canada are divided primarily by participant age, with all following the organization's fiscal year of 1 September to 31 August. As of September 2016, all full-time sections utilize a redeveloped model called the Canadian Path. This overhaul which had begun in 2013  was the first since 1965. It has been said that the redevelopment was driven in part to address falling membership and meet the expectations set out in the WOSM resolutions' World Scout Youth Programme Policy, "to make programs relevant to the needs and demands of the current day's youth, the goal of the project was to do just that." The new approach takes notes from traditional Scouting practices, and is meant to allow youth to develop themselves along a common path (with section-specific themes) from Beaver Scouts up to and including Rover Scouts.

Beaver Scouts

Beaver Scouts is a Beavers section for children between ages 5 to 7. The Beaver Scout uniform includes a hat, a neckerchief, a neckerchief slide, and a vest. Activities include crafts, games, sports, music, hikes, and camping. Their motto is "Sharing Sharing Sharing". A Beaver is a Totem animal or representation of nature, hence the name.

Cub Scouts

The Cub Scouts section is for children ages 8 to 10. Activities of the program include hiking, camping, and water activities such as canoeing and kayaking. The program's purpose is to encourage members to "try new and more challenging activities". Their motto is "Do your best". A Wolf Cub is yet another representation of nature, hence the namesake.

Scouts

The Scouts section is for youth between 11 and 14 years old. Activities include outdoor activities, camping, and hiking, as well as participation in youth forums. It claims that its purpose is "having fun while gaining valuable leadership skills and self-confidence".

Venturer Scouts

The Venturer Scout section is for teens between 15 and 17 years old. Its stated aim to "offer exciting, real life, hands-on experiences for youth". Its activities include hiking, camping, and more advanced training programs: white water kayaking / canoeing, mountaineering, week-long expeditions in National parks and international activities including service projects.

Rover Scouts

Rover Scouts is the eldest youth section in Scouting and is for teens and young adults between 18 and 26 years old. Activities include "high adventure activities" ranging from multi-week expeditions with increasingly-difficult challenges, taking on leadership roles working with younger sections, and assisting with or running service projects at a local / national / international level.

Vocational programs
 Medical Venturers/Medical Rovers (Medvents/Medrovers) is a program that consists of Venturers and Rovers that learn and provide first-aid. Medical Venturers have been credited with saving lives in Toronto by using an AED to assist a patient in cardiac arrest.
 Fire Venturers learn basic fire fighting skills while working with fire departments
 Police Venturers learn firearm safety, crowd control, and similar skills while working with police departments
 Service Corps Venturers/Rovers provide community service within the Scouting Community as well as outside organizations including Heritage Canada, The Ottawa Hospital Foundation, The Ottawa Food Bank and The Royal Canadian Legion's Dominion Command.
In the Ottawa region (as a part of Scouts Canada's Voyageur Council), the Voyageur Council Service Alliance (VCSA) includes MedVents, PoliceVents and the Service Corps. Among its many efforts, the VCSA: Service Corps assists the Canadian Heritage (previously National Capital Commission) with on-the-ground services (notably the Lost Children Service) during events such as: Canada Day, Winterlude (on-canal patrols to assist the public), Lighting the Capital at Christmas, the spring Tulip Festival, and others.

Part-time programs
Scouts Canada also has programs designated as Part-Time Programs.

ScoutsAbroad

ScoutsAbroad is a program which was created to support the Canadian Brotherhood Fund. Scouts in wealthier countries like Canada help Scouts in developing countries help themselves on the road to self-sufficiency. The Canadian Brotherhood Fund provides through grants, "seed money" for many international development projects. The ScoutsAbroad program also promotes youth involvement in learning about their world through penpal programs, international events, and international exchanges.

International Development Projects 
International Development Projects are known internally as Brotherhood Projects which stems from the Canadian Brotherhood Fund. Groups of Scouts in developing countries develop and carry out projects to improve their own lives and the future of their communities. In some cases, members of Scouts Canada participate in travelling abroad to assist in carrying out portions of a project. There has been over 13 projects completed since 2007.

SCOUTSabout
The SCOUTS about program aims to fulfill Scouting's mission with those children who are not members of a Scouting organization. SCOUTSabout is implemented in 3-month long modules, often after school, to appeal to those families who do not want or can not commit to year-round activities. Theme based, the focus is on structured play and learning by doing without uniforms, badge programs and ceremonies. SCOUTSabout is for children between 5 and 10 years old.

Extreme Adventure
Extreme Adventure offers the opportunity for young people aged from 14 to 17, to plan and participate in a variety of short-term adventure-based activities. Example activities are: hiking, long-term camping and travelling abroad to participate in humanitarian projects. The program seeks to realise Scouting's mission with non-members. There is no uniform and are no ceremonies associated with this program. It is designed to include development of leadership skills and self-esteem and the participation in community projects that is also offered through the ordinary programs. Extreme Adventure is based on the Venturer Amory Adventure Award concept.

Major youth awards
Scouts Canada has several major youth awards which include:
 The Chief Scout's Award was established in 1973 as the top award in the Scout section.
 The Queen's Venturer Award is the top award in the Venturer section. In 1968, the normal upper age for members of the Scout section was reduced from 17 to 14 and the Venturer section was created for ages 14–17. As part of these changes, Queen's Scout rank was replaced with the Queen's Venturer Award.
 The Amory Adventure Award is awarded to the Venturer company that exhibits the most initiative in conceiving, planning, and executing an outdoor adventure.
 The Medal of the Maple was created in 2007 and is awarded for distinguished youth service and excellence within the Scouting Movement.

Camps

Scouts Canada operates over 125 camps across Canada. Popular camps include Camp Impeesa, Haliburton Scout Reserve, Camp Byng and Tamaracouta Scout Reserve. The Tamaracouta Scout Reserve is among the oldest continually operating Scout camps in the world.

Major events

Canadian Scout Jamboree

The Canadian Scout Jamboree or CJ is a national jamboree run by Scouts Canada for Scouts and Venturers from across Canada. They have been held in 1949, 1953, 1961, and about every four years since 1977.

ADVenture
ADVenture is run by Scouts Canada for members of the Venturer Scout Section. Created to further differentiate Scouts and Venturers, ADVenture provides a different style of national camp for an older age group.
 2012: 1st Venturer ADVenture, Haliburton Scout Reserve, Haliburton, Ontario
 2014: 2nd Venturer ADVenture, Camp Nor’ Wes, Newfoundland

World Jamborees hosted by Scouts Canada
 8th World Scout Jamboree, 1955, Niagara-on-the-Lake, Ontario; first World Jamboree held outside of Europe
 15th World Scout Jamboree, 1983, Kananaskis, Alberta
 24th World Scout Jamboree, 2019, The Summit Bechtel Family National Scout Reserve in Glen Jean, West Virginia. Scouts Canada co-hosted along with the Asociación de Scouts de México and the Boy Scouts of America.

Canadian Moots
Moots are for Rover Scouts.
 1st Canadian Rover Moot: 1951, Blue Springs, Ontario 538 Attend
 2nd Canadian Rover Moot: 1956, Sussex, New Brunswick
 3rd Canadian Rover Moot: 1959, Banff, Alberta
 4th Canadian Rover Moot: 1962, Mekinac, Quebec Around 1000 attend
 5th Canadian Rover Moot: 1966, Parksville, British Columbia
 6th Canadian Rover Moot: 1970, Birds Hill Park, Winnipeg, Manitoba
 7th Canadian Rover Moot: 1974, Camp Samac, Oshawa, Ontario
 8th Canadian Rover Moot: 1978, Camp Impeesa, Pincher Creek, Alberta
 9th Canadian Rover Moot: 1982, Camp Wetaskiwin, St. Catharines, Ontario 531 Attend
 10th Canadian Rover Moot: 1986, McLean Park, Langley, British Columbia

National Youth Network

The National Youth Network consists of Scouts Canada youth from across the country. The purpose of the National Youth Network is to ensure meaningful youth involvement in all Scouts Canada decisions, support the organization of Council Youth Networks, and encourage youth to take on leadership roles.

The National Youth Network typically consists of one National Youth Commissioner, three Assistant National Youth Commissioners and 20 Council Youth Commissioners.

Projects
Develop and promote FLEX, FAST and FOCUS – Scouts Canada’s Youth Leadership training programs for Cub Scouts, Scouts, and Venturer Scouts. In 2018, Scouts Canada released the Scouts Canada Youth Leadership Training which will replace FLEX, FAST, and FOCUS, introducing courses for all five sections which integrate with the new Canadian Path program. The Youth Network also maintains and adjudicates the Medal of the Maple for Distinguished Youth Service.

The National Youth Network is only a small part of the larger Scouts Canada Youth Network that is made up of the National Youth Network, the Council Youth Networks, the Area Youth Networks and other youth representatives across Canada.

Initiatives
Scouts Canada is in the process of actively increasing its membership nationwide.  This process includes more direct program support to leaders; building on such things as a partnership with the Robert Bateman Foundation, a program help line, an award-winning Climate Change program and a variety of camping programs across the country.

Controversies

Organizational structure

Scouts Canada is governed, like all incorporated non-profit organization, by a Board of Governors. Each Council elects three Voting Members of whom at least one must be a youth. All members are able to vote for and or be nominees for Council Voting Members. At the National Annual General Meeting of Members, Voting Members elect the Board of Governors and the National Commissioner.

There are Scouters, most notably members of an organization called SCOUT eh! who believe there is a lack of representation and lack of accountability of this governance structure.

Child protection
In 2012, the CBC ran a documentary suggesting that Scouts Canada had not always reported leaders who had sexually abused children to the police, relating to incidents that took place between 1960 and 1990.  Scouts Canada subsequently posted a video apology followed by "a thorough, arms-length review of all records held by Scouts Canada on Leader suspensions or terminations that are related to abuse" by KPMG's forensic investigations unit.  The report from KPMG subsequently "found no systemic intent to cover up or hide incidents of abuse".

Youth Protection
In the fall of 1996, Scouts Canada modernized its screening practices for adult members to require a Police Record Check, with a Vulnerable Sector Check added in 2015-2016. As part of this screening, local volunteers interview applicants and check the multiple references they must provide as part of the Volunteer Recruitment and Development (VRAD) process. Scouts Canada volunteers are prohibited from being alone with a youth member; two fully screened volunteers are required to be present at all times with any youth. In the event that a volunteer is suspected of misconduct, Scouts Canada policy requires that they are immediately suspended and the relevant authorities are notified with all information shared as part of an investigation into the volunteer's actions.

Scouts Canada provides with some of its handbooks (and online), a booklet called How to Protect Your Children from Child Abuse: A Parent's Guide. In addition, it is a badge requirement in the Scout program for parents and youth to review a portion of How to Protect Your Children from Child Abuse: A Parent's Guide

Relations with other Scout associations
In 1999, the Baden-Powell Service Association Federation of Canada (B-PSAFC) was ordered by Industry Canada "to take the word 'scout' out of its title." Scouts Canada also sought for the removal of the name Baden Powell, going on to say "...there's one scouting association in Canada, one in the world, every country has only one that's how Baden Powell set up scouting..." because "[Baden Powell] felt anything else would dilute the program, cause confusion and hurt the programs for young people." The World Organization of the Scouting Movement (WOSM) website reinforces this policy which states, "There can only be one [National Scout Organization] per country."

See also
 Scouting in Canada
 Girl Guides of Canada

References

External links

 Scouts Canada
 Camps operated by Scouts Canada
 Canadian Jamboree Badge Reference Page

Charities based in Canada
World Organization of the Scout Movement member organizations
Scouting and Guiding in Canada
Youth organizations established in 1946
1946 establishments in Canada
Clubs and societies in Canada